"I Feel the Earth Move" is a song written and recorded by American singer-songwriter Carole King, for her second studio album Tapestry. Additionally, the song is one half of the double A-sided single, the flip side of which was "It's Too Late". Together, both "I Feel the Earth Move" and "It's Too Late" became among the biggest mainstream pop hits of 1971.

Jon Landau's review of the Tapestry for Rolling Stone praised King's voice on this track, saying it negotiates turns from "raunchy" to "bluesy" to "harsh" to "soothing", with the last echoing the development of the song's melody into its chorus. Landau describes the melody of the refrain as "a pretty pop line". Forty years later, Rolling Stone stated that King's "warm, earnest singing" brought "earthy joy" to the song. Music journalist Harvey Kubernik wrote that "I Feel the Earth Move" was "probably the most sexually aggressive song on the Tapestry album" and a "brave" opening to an album whose mood is mostly "mellow confessionality". AllMusic critic Stewart Mason describes the song as "the ultimate in hippie-chick eroticism" and writes that it "sounds like the unleashing of an entire generation of soft-spoken college girls' collective libidos".  Cash Box described the song as being a "forceful 'earthquake song'" and considered its pairing with "It's Too Late" as a single to be "double dynamite."

Author James Perone praised the way the lyrics and music work together. As a prime example, he notes the syncopated rhythm to the melody on which King sings "tumbling down". This rhythm, putting the accent at the end of the word "tumbling" rather than at the beginning, produces a "musical equivalent of a tumble." Perone also notes that the fast tempo allows the listener to feel the singer's excitement over being near her lover, and that the lyrics also express sexual tension even though that tension is left implicit. Perone attributes some of the song's success to producer Lou Adler's decision to highlight King's piano playing in the mix, giving it a different feel from the guitar-based singer-songwriter approach King took in her prior album. Mason also attributes the song's success to the "piano-led groove" and to King's vocal delivery.

King's version of "I Feel the Earth Move" peaked at number 1 on the Billboard Hot 100 chart dated June 19, 1971. It remained there for five consecutive weeks. It also peaked at number 6 in the United Kingdom.

Given its upbeat nature, Ode Records selected "I Feel the Earth Move" as the A-side to Tapestrys first single. It achieved airplay, but then disc jockeys and listeners began to prefer the slower, lamenting B-side "It's Too Late". Both sides received airplay for a while, but eventually "It's Too Late" dominated. In fact, on the concurrent Cash Box singles chart, which still tracked the progress of both sides of a single separately, "It's Too Late" spent four weeks at number 1 while "I Feel the Earth Move" did not chart at all. Regardless, since Billboard had declared the record a double A-side and their chart gradually became seen by many as the "official" singles chart, it is generally listed in books and articles that both "I Feel the Earth Move" and "It's Too Late" reached number 1.

Together with "It's Too Late", "I Feel the Earth Move" was named by the RIAA as number 213 of 365 Songs of the Century.

Personnel
 Carole King – keyboards, vocals
 Danny Kootch – electric guitar
 Charles Larkey – electric bass
 Joel O'Brien – drums

Charts
All entries charted with "It's Too Late".

Weekly charts

Year-end charts

Martika version

Released in summer 1989, "I Feel the Earth Move" is the third single from American singer-songwriter and actress Martika's self-titled debut album, Martika (1988). It reached number seven in the United Kingdom and number two in Australia. The single also reached number 25 on the US Billboard Hot 100 but quickly fell down the chart after radio stations pulled it from their playlists in the wake of the 1989 San Francisco earthquake. The music video was shot during the promotional tour for this album.

Track listing
 Cassette and 7-inch single'''
 Side A – "I Feel the Earth Move"
 Side B – "Quiero Entregarte Mi Amor" (Spanish version of "More Than You Know")

Charts

Weekly charts

Year-end charts

Certifications

Other covers
In 2013 the song was played live and recorded by Shinedown at the Henson Recording Studios, for their performance of Warner Music's series "The Live Room".

In 2015 the song was featured in a mashup with Alanis Morissette's "Hand In My Pocket" on American television series Glee, "Jagged Little Tapestry", covered by Naya Rivera and Heather Morris.

In 2018, Glim Spanky included a cover of the song on their single "Orokamono-tachi".

Carole King briefly covers the song herself while playing the recurring character of Sophie Bloom on Gilmore Girls: A Year in the Life episode 3 ("Summer").

Usage in media
The first 22 seconds of the Carole King version is used for the earthquake room exhibit at the Oregon Museum of Science & Industry (OMSI) in Portland, Oregon.

The song's lyrics are referenced in the Robert Wilson opera, Einstein on the Beach, during the "Trial/Prison" scene in Act III.

Loretta Swit performs a cover of the song in a Season 5 episode of The Muppet Show in a "salute to the San Andreas fault".

Phish has teased the song in multiple improvisational jams.

The song is featured prominently in the film Slow Dancing in the Big City, but does not appear on its soundtrack.

The song is heard in the background at Bed Bath & Beyond in the 2006 comedy film Click when Michael Newman (Adam Sandler) is looking for a universal television remote and when he wakes up upon returning to his younger age.

The song was used in Japan for a Toyota RAV4 commercial in 2001.

The song was titled in Season 1 Episode 25 of Guardians of the Galaxy.

The choral refrain and title's namesake is used in the refrain of Amon Amarth's "Tattered Banners and Bloody Flags" with the accompanying variation or the melody. "The Earth moves under our feet the sky comes tumbling down (...) trembles to its knees". The entire chorus is also a melodic reinterpretation of the original's chorus. The melody is reused in the same band's track "For Victory or Death".

The first 47 seconds was played during the documentary Batas Militar (1997).

Leah Andreone's version of the song was used in 1997 movie Speed 2: Cruise Control''.

References

1971 singles
1971 songs
1989 singles
Billboard Hot 100 number-one singles
Carole King songs
Columbia Records singles
Martika songs
Ode Records singles
Song recordings produced by Lou Adler
Songs written by Carole King